The Sternberg Lake District Nature Park lies in the lake regions of Warin-Neukloster, the Sternberg Lake District and the central Warnow valley in the districts of Ludwigslust-Parchim and Nordwestmecklenburg in the German state of Mecklenburg-Vorpommern. It lies east of Lake Schwerin in the region of Sternberg, Brüel, Güstrow, Bützow, Warin and Neukloster.

It was founded on 1 January 2005 as the most recent of the nature parks in Mecklenburg-Vorpommern and is one of the 13 nature parks in Germany that has been awarded the Qualitätsnaturpark seal of quality.

The total area of the nature park is 540 km², of which 41% is farmland, 28% woodland, 17% pasture with some agricultural use, 7% rivers and lakes, and 4% settlements and transport infrastructure.

The nature park contains forested sandar, the glacial meltwater valleys - so-called Urstromtäler - of the rivers Warnow and Mildenitz, meltwater lakes and terminal moraines. The nature park has a large number of lakes, the largest of which are the Großer Wariner See, Groß Labenzer See, Großer Sternberger See and Neuklostersee.

See also 
 List of nature parks in Germany

External links 
 State act establishing the  "Sternberger Seenland" nature park dated 20 December 2004
 Sternberg Lake District Nature Park
 Nature park plan 2010 with comprehensive facts and maps (data and facts, principles and objectives, projects)
 Information about the nature park

Nature parks in Mecklenburg-Western Pomerania
Nordwestmecklenburg
Ludwigslust-Parchim